Old High German is an inflected language, and as such its nouns, pronouns, and adjectives must be declined in order to serve a grammatical function. A set of declined forms of the same word pattern is called a declension. There are five grammatical cases in Old High German.

Grammatical cases
A complete declension consists of five grammatical cases.

Description of cases
The nominative case, which is used to express the subject of a statement.  It is also used with copulative verbs.
The accusative case, which expresses the direct object of a verb.  In English, except for a small number of words which display a distinct accusative case (e.g., who > whom, I > me, he > him), the accusative and nominative cases are identical.
The genitive case, which expresses possession, measurement, or source.  In English, the genitive case is represented analytically by the preposition of or by the enclitic "–'s", which itself developed from the genitive case. This –'s is related to the common Gothic "-s".
The dative case, which expresses the recipient of an action, the indirect object of a verb.  In English, the prepositions to, from and for most commonly denote this case analytically.
The instrumental case, which is used to express the object, with which its activity is performed. It roughly corresponds to the prepositions with and by.

Order of cases
English grammars of Old High German often present the cases in the order NOM-ACC-GEN-DAT-INST.

Strong vocalic declensions

Note: Declensions are named according to their form in Proto-Germanic.  Often intervening sound changes render the once transparent stem endings opaque, and the name may no longer make much sense synchronically.

The -a declension
This declension has as counterparts the second declension (us/um) of Latin and the omicron declension (os/on) of Greek. It contains masculine and neuter nouns.

Examples of masculine nouns declined like tag "day": bërg "mountain", wëg "way", geist "spirit", himil "heaven", tiufal "devil", kuning "king".
Notes:
Disyllabic nouns ending in -al, -ar and -an, with long stems, sometimes drop the -a- before an ending beginning with a vowel, e.g. masculine singular ackar "acre, field", genitive singular ackres.  Note that in these cases, the -a- is an epenthetic vowel that was not originally present (compare Gothic akrs < Proto-Germanic *akraz), and so the "deletion" of this vowel is really the preservation of the original form.
Proper names in the -a declension take a pronominal accusative ending -an, e.g. nominative Petrus, accusative Petrusan; similarly truhtīn "God, Lord", accusative truhtīnan.
Examples of neuter nouns declined like wort: barn "child", sēr "pain", swërt "sword", honag "honey".
Notes:
The situation with long-stemmed disyllabic nouns ending in -al, -ar and -an is the same as for the corresponding masculines, e.g. nominative zwīfal "doubt", genitive zwīfles.
Diminutives in -īn and -līn, e.g. magatīn "little maid" (neuter!), fingarlīn "little finger", are declined the same except in the Upper German dialects.  In those dialects, final -n is dropped in the nominative and accusative, and furthermore in Allemannic the nominative and accusative plural end in -iu.
The neuter plural should have had the ending -u in short-stem neuters, but has lost it due to analogy with long-stem neuters, which exhibit syncope as in Old Saxon and Old English.

The -ja declension
This declension was originally just the -a declension with an immediately preceding j.  However, due to various sound laws, a new declension subcategory has arisen that does not exactly follow the form of the plain -a declension.  Similar developments occurred in Greek and the Slavic languages, among others.

This declension has as counterparts the second declension nouns in (-ius/-ium) of Latin.  The counterparts in Greek are some second declension nouns in (-ios/-ion), as well as many that show effects of palatalization (e.g., -zdos < *-gyos or *-dyos; -llos < *-lyos; -ptos < -*pyos; -ssos or -ttos < -*tyos; -airos/-eiros/-oiros < *-aryos/-eryos/-oryos; -ainos/-einos/-oinos < *-anyos/enyos/onyos; etc., and similarly for neuter nouns in -ion or *-yon).  It contains masculine and neuter nouns.

{| class="wikitable"
! rowspan="3" |
! colspan="8" | hirti; hirte / hirtā (-a) shepard m.! colspan="8" | kunni; kunni race n.|-
! colspan="4" | Singular! colspan="4" | Plural! colspan="4" | Singular! colspan="4" | Plural|-
! colspan="2" | Early! colspan="2" | Late! colspan="2" | Early! colspan="2" | Late! colspan="2" | Early! colspan="2" | Late! colspan="2" | Early! colspan="2" | Late|-
! Nominative, Accusative|| hirti || –i || hirti || –i || hirte || –e || hirtā (-a) || –ā (–a)|| kunni || -i || kunni || -i || kunni || -i || kunni || -i 
|-
! Genitive|| hirtes || –es || hirtes || –es || hirteo (-io) || –eo (–io) || hirto || –o|| kunnes || –es || kunnes || –es || kunneo (-io) || –eo (–io) || kunno || –o|-
! Dative|| hirtie || –ie || hirte || –e || hirtum (-un, -on) || –um (–un, –on) || hirtim (-in) || –im (–in)|| kunnie || –ie || kunne || –e || kunnum (-un, -on) || –um (–un, –on) || kunnim (-in) || –im (–in)|-
! Instrumental|| hirtiu || –iu || hirtu (-o) || –u (–o) || -- || -- || -- || -- 
|| kunniu || –iu || kunnu (-o) || –u (–o) || -- || -- || -- || -- 
|}
Note that the transition from early to late forms occurred during the ninth century.  Late-form ja-stems are declined identically to a-stems except for the added -i in the neuter nominative and accusative, and in the masculine nominative and accusative singular.  Compare the equivalent nouns in Old English, e.g. rīce "kingdom" (neuter).

Sample nouns like hirti: agent nouns in -āri (-ari, -eri), e.g. wahtāri (-ari, -eri) "watchman", lērāri "teacher", scrībāri "writer, scribe"; also, karkāri "prison", altāri "altar", rucki "back", phuzzi, puzzi "well", kāsi "cheese".

Sample nouns like kunni: enti "end", rīhhi "kingdom", betti "bed", gizungi "language", finstarnessi "darkness", heri "army" (genitive singular heries, dative singular herie, herige).

The -wa declension

{| class="wikitable"
! rowspan="2" |
! colspan="4" | snēo, snē; snēwā (-a) snow m.! colspan="4" | kneo; kneo knee n.|-
! colspan="2" | Singular! colspan="2" | Plural! colspan="2" | Singular! colspan="2" | Plural|-
! Nominative, Accusative|| snēo, snē || –o, – || snēwā (-a) || –wā (–wa)|| kneo || –o, – || kneo || –o, –|-
! Genitive|| snēwes || –wes || snēwo || –wo|| knëwes || –wes || knëwo || –wo|-
! Dative|| snēwe || –e || snēwum (–un, –on) || –um (–un, –on)|| knëwe || –e || knëwum (–un, –on) || –um (–un, –on)|}

Notes:-o in the nominative can be dropped following a long vowel.
When a consonant precedes the -w, an epenthetic vowel -a- (sometimes -o- or -e-) appears in the oblique cases, e.g. neuter trëso "treasure", genitive trësawes.
Among the other nouns in this declension:
 Masculine lēo "grave", sēo "sea", scato (genitive scatawes) "shadow", bū (genitive būwes) "dwelling".
Neuter rēo "corpse", zëso (genitive zësawes) "right side", smëro (genitive smërawes) "grease".

The -ō declension
This declension counterparts the first declension (a) of Latin, and the alpha declension (a/as) of Greek. It contains feminine nouns. The nominative, which should have had the ending -u, has been merged with the accusative in -a.

{| class="wikitable"
! rowspan="2" |
! colspan="4" | gëba; gëbā gift f.|-
! colspan="2" | Singular! colspan="2" | Plural|-
! Nominative, Accusative|| gëba || –a || gëbā || –ā|-
! Genitive|| gëba (-u, -o) || –a (–u, –o) || gëbōnō || –ōnō|-
! Dative|| gëbu (-o) || –u (–o) || gëbōm (-ōn, -on) || –ōm (–ōn, –on)|}

Sample nouns of this declension: gëba "gift", ërda "earth", ēra "honor", zala "number", triuwa "fidelity", corunga "temptation", hertida "hardness", miltida "compassion", gi-nāda "favor", lōsunga "deliverance", stunta "time".

The -jō declension
{| class="wikitable"
! rowspan="3" |
! colspan="12" | sunta; sunte, -eā (-iā) / suntā sin f.! colspan="4" | kuningin; kuninginnā queen f.|-
! colspan="6" | Singular! colspan="6" | Plural! rowspan="2" colspan="2" | Singular! rowspan="2" colspan="2" | Plural|-
! colspan="2" | Early #1! colspan="2" | Early #2! colspan="2" | Late! colspan="2" | Early #1! colspan="2" | Early #2! colspan="2" | Late|-
! Nominative, 
|| sunte || –e || suntea (-ia) || –ea (–ia) || sunta || –a || sunte || –e || suntea (-ia) || –ea (–ia) || suntā || –ā 
|| kuningin || –in || kuninginnā || –innā|-
! Accusative|| sunte || –e || suntea (-ia) || –ea (–ia) || sunta || –a || sunte || –e || suntea (-ia) || –ea (–ia) || suntā || –ā 
|| kuninginna (-in) || –inna (–in) || kuninginnā || –innā|-
! Genitive|| sunte || –e || suntea (-ia) || –ea (–ia) || sunta (-u, -o)|| –a (–u, –o) || sunteōno || –eōno || sunteōno || –eōno || suntōno || –ōno 
|| kuninginna || –inna || kuninginnōno || –innōno|-
! Dative|| suntiu || –iu || suntiu || –iu || suntu (-o)|| –u (–o) || sunteōm || –eōm || sunteōm || –eōm || suntōm (-ōn) || –ōm (–ōn) 
|| kuninginnu || –innu || kuninginnōm (-ōn) || –innōm (–innōn)|}

Sample nouns like sunta: hella "hell", sibba, sippa "peace", minna "love", krippa "manger".

Sample nouns like kuningin: forasagin "prophetess", friuntin "friend", burdin "burden".

The -i declension
This declension counterparts the vowel stems of the third declension (is) of Latin, and the third declension of Greek. It contains masculine and feminine nouns.  Note that masculine nouns have become identical to -a stem nouns in the singular, while feminine nouns have preserved the original declension.

{| class="wikitable"
! rowspan="3" |
! colspan="8" | gast; gesti guest m.! colspan="8" | anst; ensti favor f.|-
! colspan="4" | Singular! colspan="4" | Plural! colspan="4" | Singular! colspan="4" | Plural|-
! colspan="2" | Early! colspan="2" | Late! colspan="2" | Early! colspan="2" | Late! colspan="2" | Early! colspan="2" | Late! colspan="2" | Early! colspan="2" | Late|-
! Nominative, Accusative|| gast || – || gast || – || gesti || –i || gesti || –i|| anst || – || ansti || – || ensti || –i || ensti || –i 
|-
! Genitive|| gastes || –es || gastes || –es || gesteo (-io) || –eo (–io) || gesto || –o|| ensti || –i || ensti || –i || ensteo (-io) || –eo (–io) || ensto || –o|-
! Dative|| gaste || –e || gaste || –e || gestim (-in) || –im (–in) || gesten || –en|| ansti || –i || ansti || –i || enstim (-in) || –im (–in) || ensten || –en|-
! Instrumental|| gastiu (gestiu) || –iu || gastu || –u || -- || -- || -- || -- 
|| --|| --|| --|| -- || -- || -- || -- || -- 
|}

The -u declension
This declension was much more reduced compared to other old Germanic languages such as Old English.  Most nouns were transferred outright to the i- or sometimes the a-declension, and the remaining nouns were heavily influenced by the i-declension—only the nominative and accusative singular are different, ending in -u.

{| class="wikitable"
! rowspan="3" |
! colspan="8" | situ; siti custom m.! colspan="2" | fihu cattle n.|-
! colspan="4" | Singular! colspan="4" | Plural! colspan="2" | Singular|-
! colspan="2" | Early! colspan="2" | Late! colspan="2" | Early! colspan="2" | Late! colspan="2" |
|-
! Nominative, Accusative|| situ || –u || situ || –u || siti || –i || siti || –i|| fihu || –u|-
! Genitive|| sites || –es || sites || –es || siteo (-io) || –eo (–io) || sito || –o|| fihes || –es|-
! Dative|| site || –e || site || –e || sitim (-in) || –im (–in) || siten || –en|| fihe || –e|-
! Instrumental|| sitiu (sitiu) || –iu || situ || –u || -- || -- || -- || -- 
|| --|| -- 
|}

Notes:
Five masculine nouns follow this declension: situ "custom", fridu "peace", hugu "understanding", sigu "victory", and sunu "son" (also sun).
Only a single neuter noun, fihu "cattle", follows the declension, and exists only in the singular.
The only trace of a feminine u-declension is in the word hant "hand", declined as a feminine i-stem except in the dative plural, where the old u-declension forms hantum, -un, -on persist.

The -ī declension
This class consists of feminine abstract nouns and came about through the falling together of two declensions that were still different in Gothic: compare the Gothic -ei stems (a subclass of the weak declension, formed from adjectives, e.g. diupei "depth", genitive diupeins, from diups "deep") and -eins stems (a subclass of the i-declension, formed from Class I weak verbs, e.g. dáupeins "a dipping", genitive dáupeináis, from dáupjan "to dip").

Examples of other members of this class: scōnī "beauty", suoẓẓī "sweetness", snëllī "quickness", tiufī "depth", menigī, managī "multitude", irstantanī "resurrection", toufī "a dipping", welī "choice", leitī "a leading", riudī "mange".

Strong consonantal declensions

The monosyllabic consonant declension

{| class="wikitable"
! rowspan="2" |
! colspan="4" | man; man man m.! colspan="4" | naht; naht night f.|-
! colspan="2" | Singular! colspan="2" | Plural! colspan="2" | Singular! colspan="2" | Plural|-
! Nominative, Accusative|| man || – || man || –|| naht || – || naht || –|-
! Genitive|| mannes || –es || manno || –o|| naht || – || nahto || –o|-
! Dative|| man, manne || –, –e || mannum (-om, -un, -on) || –um (–om, –un, –on)|| naht || – || nahtum (-un, -on) || –um (–un, –on)|}

This class was already falling apart in the earliest texts:
Only a very small number of nouns remain in this declension.  The vast majority have passed over to the i-declension.eoman, ioman "someone" and neoman, nioman "no one" have a pronominal ending -an in the accusative singular, e.g. eomannan, neomannan.
Masculine fuoẓ "foot" has passed over to the i-declension but retains the consonant endings –um (–un, –on) in the dative plural.
The only trace of neuters of this class is the optional dative singular hūs "to a house" beside regular hūse.buoch "book" is declined mostly as a neuter a-stem in the singular but a feminine consonant stem in the plural.burg "borough, city" and brust "breast" are sometimes declined as feminine consonant stems but sometimes as feminine i-stems.

The -r declension
{| class="wikitable"
! rowspan="3" |
! colspan="8" | fater; faterā (-a) father m.! colspan="8" | muoter; muoter mother f.|-
! colspan="4" | Singular! colspan="4" | Plural! rowspan="2" colspan="2" | Singular! rowspan="2" colspan="2" | Plural|-
! colspan="2" | Early! colspan="2" | Late! colspan="2" | Early! colspan="2" | Late|-
! Nominative, Accusative|| fater || – || fater || – || faterā (-a) || –ā (–a) || faterā (-a) || –ā (–a)|| muoter || – || muoter || –|-
! Genitive|| fater || – || fateres || –es || fatero || –o || fatero || –o|| muoter || – || muotero || –o|-
! Dative|| fater || – || fatere || –e || faterum || –um || faterun (-on) || –un (–on)|| muoter || – || muoterum (-un, -on) || –um (–un, –on)|}fater "father" has moved to the a-declension later on, and even in early documents the nominative and accusative plural has borrowed -ā (-a) from the a-stems.muoter "mother" preserves the original declension, unmixed with a-stem forms.  The other members of this class follow the same declension: bruoder "brother", tohter "daughter", and swëster "sister".

The -nd declension

{| class="wikitable"
! rowspan="3" |
! colspan="6" | friunt; friunt, friuntā (-a) friend m.|-
! rowspan="2" colspan="2" | Singular! colspan="4" | Plural|-
! colspan="2" | Early! colspan="2" | Late|-
! Nominative, Accusative|| friunt || – || friunt || – || friuntā (-a) || –ā (–a)|-
! Genitive|| friuntes || –es || friunto || –o || friunto || –o|-
! Dative|| friunte || –e || friuntum || –um || friuntun (-on) || –un (–on)|}

This declension has almost entirely merged with the a-declension.  Only in early texts do the nominative and accusative plural have a separate, endingless form.

A large number of nouns belong to this declension, such as fīant "enemy", wīgant "warrior", and many others in -ant.

The -z declension

This class consists of neuter nouns and corresponds to Greek neuters in -os and Latin neuters in -us (genitive -eris, -oris).  Formally, these nouns look like regular neuters except that a suffix -ir (from Proto-Germanic -iz-, from Proto-Indo-European -es-) is added to the stem in the plural and triggers umlaut.  This class was massively expanded in Middle and Modern High German.

{| class="wikitable"
! rowspan="3" |
! colspan="6" | lamb; lembir lamb n.|-
! rowspan="2" colspan="2" | Singular! colspan="4" | Plural|-
! colspan="2" | Early! colspan="2" | Late|-
! Nominative, Accusative|| lamb || – || lembir || –ir || lembir || –ir|-
! Genitive|| lambes || –es || lembiro || –iro || lembiro || –iro|-
! Dative|| lambe || –e || lembirum (-irom) || –irum (–irom) || lembirun (-iron) || –irun (–iron)|-
! Instrumental|| lambu (-o) || –u (–o) || -- || -- || -- || --
|}

A small number of nouns were declined according to this declension, among them lamb "lamb", kalb "calf", blat "leaf", and grab "grave".

The weak declension

{| class="wikitable"
! rowspan="2" |
! colspan="4" | hano; hanon (-un) cock m.! colspan="4" | hërza; hërzun (-on) heart n.! colspan="4" | zunga; zungūn tongue f.|-
! colspan="2" | Singular! colspan="2" | Plural! colspan="2" | Singular! colspan="2" | Plural! colspan="2" | Singular! colspan="2" | Plural|-
! Nominative|| hano || –o || hanon (-un) || –on (–un)|| hërza || –a || hërzun (-on) || –un (–on)|| zunga || –a || zungūn || –ūn|-
! Accusative|| hanon (-un) || –on (–un) || hanon (-un) || –on (–un)|| hërza || –a || hërzun (-on) || –un (–on)|| zungūn || –ūn || zungūn || –ūn|-
! Genitive|| hanen (-in) || –en (–in) || hanōno || –ōno|| hërzen (-in) || –en (–in) || hërzōno || –ōno|| zungūn || –ūn || zungōno || –ōno|-
! Dative|| hanen (-in) || –en (–in) || hanōm (-ōn) || –ōm (–ōn)|| hërzen (-in) || –en (–in) || hërzōm (-ōn) || –ōm (–ōn)|| zungūn || –ūn || zungōm (-ōn) || –ōm (–ōn)|}

Adjectives
Adjectives in Old High German, as in the other Germanic languages, can be declined according to two different paradigms, commonly called "strong" and "weak".  This represents a significant innovation in Germanic, although a similar development has taken place in the Baltic and Slavic languages.

Adjectives in Proto-Indo-European—as is still the case in Latin, Greek, and most other daughters—are declined in exactly the same way as nouns.  Germanic "strong" adjectives, however, take many of their endings from the declension of pronouns, while "weak" adjectives take the endings of -n stem nouns, regardless of the underlying stem class of the adjective.

In general, weak adjectival endings are used when the adjective is accompanied by a definite article, and strong endings are used in other situations.  However, weak endings are occasionally used in the absence of a definite article, and cause the associated noun to have the same semantics as if a definite article were present.  In addition, some adjectives are always declined weak or strong, regardless of any accompanying articles.

Strong adjectives are inflected according to a single paradigm, the a/ō-declension.  Additional subclasses, the ja/jō- and wa/wō-declensions, differ only in the uninflected forms.  Unlike in Gothic, no i-stem or u-stem adjectives exist any more.

The strong -a/-ō declension
{| class="wikitable"
! rowspan="3"|
! colspan="12" | blint; blintēr, blintaẓ, blintiu blind|-
! colspan="6" | Singular! colspan="6" | Plural|-
! colspan="2" | Masculine! colspan="2" | Neuter! colspan="2" | Feminine! colspan="2" | Masculine! colspan="2" | Neuter! colspan="2" | Feminine|-
! Nominative|| blintēr, blint || –ēr, – || blintaẓ, blint || –aẓ, – || blintiu, blint || –iu, –|| blinte (blint) || –e (–) || blintiu (blint) || –iu (–) || blinto (blint) || –o (–)|-
! Accusative|| blintan || –an || blintaẓ, blint || –aẓ, – || blinta || –a|| blinte || –e || blintiu || –iu || blinto || –o|-
! Genitive|| blintes || –es || blintes || –es || blintera || –era|| blintero || –ero || blintero || –ero || blintero || –ero|-
! Dative|| blintemu (–emo) || –emu (–emo) || blintemu (–emo) || –emu (–emo) || blinteru (–ero) || –eru (–ero)|| blintēm (–ēn)|| –ēm (–ēn) || blintēm (–ēn)|| –ēm (–ēn) || blintēm (–ēn)|| –ēm (–ēn)|-
! Instrumental|| blintu (–o) || –u (–o)  || blintu (–o) || –u (–o)  || -- || --
|| -- || -- || -- || -- || -- || --
|}

Note that an uninflected form optionally occurs in the nominative singular and plural of all genders, and in the accusative singular of the neuter.  In the singular cases, either form can be used when the adjective is used attributively (blint man or blintēr man "blind man") or predicatively (dër man ist blintēr or dër man ist blint "the man is blind").  In the plural, the uninflected form can be used as an alternative to the inflected form only when used predicatively (die man sint blinte or die man sint blint "the men are blind"), but not attributively (only blinte man "blind men" can occur).

The existence of two forms of the adjective, one inflected and one uninflected, is for the most part an innovation of Old High German that is not present in the other Germanic languages.  In Proto-Germanic, as still in Gothic and Old Saxon, only the neuter singular nominative and accusative had a dual form.  In the other old Germanic languages, one or the other neuter form was generalized.  The –ēr and –iu endings are also innovations specific to Old High German, based on the third-person personal pronouns.  The inherited masculine ending would be – (compare Old English masculine nominative singular blind), and the ending corresponding to –iu would likely either be – or –a.

The strong -ja/-jō declension

Adjectives of the ja/jō-declension differ from normal a/ō-declension adjectives only in the uninflected form, which ends with an -i.  For example, scōni "beautiful" has masculine nominative singular scōnēr. Other examples of such adjectives are festi "fast", māri "famous", tiuri "dear", biderbi "useful", as well as present participles, such as bëranti "bearing".

The strong -wa/-wō declension

Similarly to ja/jō-stem adjectives, adjectives of the wa/wō-declension differ from normal a/ō-declension adjectives only in the uninflected form, which ends with an -o, like the corresponding nouns.  Unlike the ja/jō-stems, however, the -w- in the stem does appear in the inflected forms. Also like the corresponding nouns, if the stem ends in a consonant preceding the final -w, an epenthetic -a- usually develops in the inflected forms between the consonant and the -w.   For example, garo "ready" has inflected nominative singular garawēr or sometimes garwēr, while fao, fō "little" has inflected nominative singular fawēr.  Other examples of such adjectives are gëlo "yellow", zëso "right(-handed)", slēo, slē "dull", frao, frō "joyful", rao, rō "raw".

The weak declension
The weak declension for adjectives is identical to the corresponding weak declensions for masculine, neuter and feminine nouns.ja/jō-stem and wa/wō-stem adjectives have identical endings, along with the same stem forms as in the strong inflected forms.  For example, scōni "beautiful" has weak masculine nominative singular scōno, while garo "ready" has weak masculine nominative singular gar(a)wo.

Numeralsein "one" is normally declined a strong adjective, but is declined as a weak adjective when meaning "alone".zwei "two" and drī "three" decline as follows:

{| class="wikitable"
! rowspan="2"|
! colspan="3" | zwēne; zwei; zwā (zwō) two|-
! Masculine! Neuter! Feminine|-
! Nominative, Accusative|| zwēne || zwei || zwā (zwō)
|-
! Genitive|| zweio || zweio || zweio
|-
! Dative|| zweim, zwein || zweim, zwein || zweim, zwein
|}

{| class="wikitable"
! rowspan="2"|
! colspan="3" | drī; driu; drīo three|-
! Masculine! Neuter! Feminine|-
! Nominative, Accusative|| drī || driu || drīo
|-
! Genitive|| drīo || drīo || drīo
|-
! Dative|| drim, drin || drim, drin || drim, drin
|}

Cardinal numerals feor, fior "four" through zwelif "twelve" are indeclinable adjectives when standing before a noun, but after a noun or when used as a noun decline as follows (approximately, as i-stems):

{| class="wikitable"
! rowspan="3"|
! colspan="8" | sëhsi; sëhsiu, sëhsu six|-
! colspan="4" | Masculine/Feminine! colspan="4" | Neuter|-
! colspan="2" | Early
! colspan="2" | Late
! colspan="2" | Early
! colspan="2" | Late
|-
! Nominative, Accusative|| sëhsi || –i || sëhsi || –i || sëhsiu || –iu || sëhsu || –u|-
! Genitive|| sëhseo || –eo || sëhso || –o || sëhseo || –eo || sëhso || –o|-
! Dative|| sëhsim || –im || sëhsin || –in || sëhsim || –im || sëhsin || –in|}

Cardinal numerals zweinzug "20" through zëhanzug "100" are indeclinable nouns, with an associated noun in the genitive plural.  hunt "100" presumably  behaves like zëhanzug. dūsunt, thūsunt "1000" is mostly treated as a feminine noun, but sometimes as a neuter noun.

The ordinal ander "second" (inflected as anderēr, anderaẓ, anderiu) follows the strong adjectival declension, while the remaining ordinals follow the weak declension.

Other numeral forms:
Distributive numerals, e.g. einluzze "one by one", zwiske "two by two".
Multiplicatives, e.g. einfalt "single", zwifalt "double, twofold", etc., declined as adjectives.
Numeral adverbs, e.g. eines "once", zwiro, zwiror, zwiron "twice", driror "thrice", feorstunt, fiorstunt "four times", fimfstunt, finfstunt "five times", sëhsstunt "six times", etc.  Sometimes einstunt, zweistunt, drīstunt also occur.

Pronouns

Personal pronouns
{| class="wikitable"
! rowspan="2" | Case! colspan="2" | ih; wir I; we|-
! Singular! Plural|-
! Nominative|| ih || wir
|-
! Accusative|| mih || unsih
|-
! Genitive|| mīn || unsēr
|-
! Dative|| mir || uns
|}

{| class="wikitable"
! rowspan="2" | Case! colspan="2" | dū, du; ir you|-
! Singular! Plural|-
! Nominative|| dū, du || ir
|-
! Accusative|| dih || iuwih
|-
! Genitive|| dīn || iuwēr
|-
! Dative|| dir || iu
|}

{| class="wikitable"
! rowspan="3"| Case! colspan="6" | ër; iẓ; siu; etc. he; it; she; they|-
! colspan="3" | Singular! colspan="3" | Plural|-
! Masculine! Neuter! Feminine! Masculine! Neuter! Feminine|-
! Nominative|| ër || iẓ || siu; sī, si
|| sie || siu || sio
|-
! Accusative|| inan, in || iẓ || sia (sie) 
|| sie || siu || sio
|-
! Genitive|| (sīn) || is, ës || ira (iru, iro)
|| iro || iro || iro
|-
! Dative|| imu, imo || imu, imo || iru, iro
|| im, in || im, in || im, in
|}

Reflexive pronoun

{| class="wikitable"
! rowspan="2" | Case! colspan="2" | sih oneself|-
! Singular! Plural|-
! Nominative|| -- || --
|-
! Accusative|| sih || sih
|-
! Genitive|| sīn (ira) || (iro)
|-
! Dative|| (imu, iru) || (im)
|}

Possessive pronouns
First and second person possessive pronouns are based on the genitive case of the corresponding personal pronouns, and are declined strong: first person mīnēr, unserēr (or unsarēr), second person dīnēr,  iuwerēr (or iuwarēr).  The third person possessive pronoun is undeclined for case:

In Franconian, shortened forms of unsēr and iuwēr exist, e.g.:

{| class="wikitable"
! rowspan="3"| Case! colspan="6" | unsēr; unsaẓ; unsu our|-
! colspan="3" | Singular! colspan="3" | Plural|-
! Masculine! Neuter! Feminine! Masculine! Neuter! Feminine|-
! Nominative|| unsēr || unsaẓ || unsu
|| unse || unsu || unso
|-
! Accusative|| unsan || unsaẓ || unsa
|| unse || unsu || unso
|-
! Genitive|| unses || unses || unsera
|| unsero || unsero || unsero
|-
! Dative|| unsemo || unsemo || unseru
|| unsēm, unsen || unsēm, unsen || unsēm, unsen
|}

Demonstrative pronouns / Definite articles
{| class="wikitable"
! rowspan="3"| Case! colspan="6" | dër; daẓ; diu the|-
! colspan="3" | Singular! colspan="3" | Plural|-
! Masculine! Neuter! Feminine! Masculine! Neuter! Feminine|-
! Nominative|| dër || daẓ || diu
|| dē, dea, dia, die || diu, (dei) || deo, dio
|-
! Accusative|| dën || daẓ || dea, dia (die)
|| dē, dea, dia, die || diu, (dei) || deo, dio
|-
! Genitive|| dës || dës || dëra, (dëru, dëro)
|| dëro || dëro || dëro
|-
! Dative|| dëmu, dëmo || dëmu, dëmo || dëru, dëro
|| dēm, dēn || dēm, dēn || dēm, dēn
|-
! Instrumental|| diu || diu || –
|| – || – || –
|}

In the Franconian dialects:

Mostly unshifted forms thër, thaẓ, thiu occur.
In Tatian, an alternative nominative singular form thie (thē) also occurs.
An alternative nominative and accusative feminine plural thie (rarely thia) also occurs.

{| class="wikitable"
! rowspan="3"|
! colspan="6" | dëse, dësēr; diz; dësiu, disiu (thisu); etc. this; these|-
! colspan="3" | Singular! colspan="3" | Plural|-
! Masculine! Neuter! Feminine! Masculine! Neuter! Feminine|-
! Nominative|| dëse, dësēr || diz || dësiu, disiu (thisu)
|| dëse || dësiu, disiu (thisu) || dëso
|-
! Accusative|| dësan || diz || dësa
|| dëse || dësiu, disiu (thisu) || dëso
|-
! Genitive|| dësses || dësses || dësera
|| dësero || dësero || dësero
|-
! Dative|| dësemu, dësemo || dësemu, dësemo || dëseru
|| dësēm, dësen || dësēm, dësen || dësēm, dësen
|-
! Instrumental|| dësiu, dësu; disiu, disu || dësiu, dësu; disiu, disu || --
|| -- || -- || --
|}

Interrogative pronouns

{| class="wikitable"
! rowspan="3"|
! colspan="2" | (h)wër; (h)waẓ'' who, what, which
|-
! colspan="2" | Singular
|-
! Masculine/Feminine
! Neuter
|-
! Nominative
|| (h)wër || (h)waẓ
|-
! Accusative
|| (h)wënan, wën || (h)waẓ
|-
! Genitive
|| (h)wës || (h)wës
|-
! Dative
|| hwëmu, wëmo || hwëmu, wëmo
|-
! Instrumental
|| (h)wiu, hiu || (h)wiu, hiu
|}

Notes:
The initial h dropped out in the beginning of the ninth century.
In the meaning of which, the associated noun is put in the genitive plural, e.g. wër manno "which man".

Additional interrogatives:
(h)wëdar "which of two"
(h)wëlīh "which"
hweolīh "of what sort"
solīh "such"
All were declined as strong adjectives.

Indefinite pronouns
Old High German had a number of indefinite pronominal forms.

The following were declined as strong adjectives:
sum, sumilīh, sumalīh "a certain one, someone"
ein "one"
einīg, eining "any, anyone" (in negative polarity sentences)
thëhein, dëhein "anyone, any" ("no one, no, none" in negative polarity sentences)
nih(h)ein, noh(h)ein "no, none"
gilīh "like" ("each" with an associated noun in the genitive plural)
manno gilīh "each man"
(gi)wëlīh, eogiwëlīh, iogiwëlīh "each"

The following were declined according to the interrogative-pronoun declension:
wër, sō wër sō' "whoever"; ëtewër "any one"; see the section on interrogative pronouns for the declension

The following were declined as nouns:
man "one", declined as a masculine consonant stem
eoman, ioman "somebody", declined as a masculine consonant stem but with a pronominal accusative singular eomannan, iomannan
neoman, nioman "nobody", declined as a masculine consonant stem but with a pronominal accusative singular neomannan, niomannan
wiht, eowiht, iowiht "anything", declined as a neuter a-stem
neowiht, niowiht "nothing", declined as a neuter a-stem

References

 

 See also 
 Old High German
 Gothic language
 Grammar of the Gothic Language''
 Proto-Indo-European noun:
 Ancient Greek grammar
 Latin declension
 Sanskrit nouns

Declension
Old High German